Nations Pride (foaled 28 April 2019) is a multiple graded stakes race winning Irish-bred British-trained Thoroughbred racehorse. As a three-year-old in 2022 he was victorious in three different countries, United Arab Emirates, Great Britain and United States. In the United States, Nations Pride captured two legs of the 
New York Racing Association Turf Trinity, the Grade I Saratoga Derby and the Grade III Jockey Club Derby Invitational Stakes and was second in the Grade I Belmont Derby.

Background
Nations Pride is a bay colt bred and owned by Sheikh Mohammed's Godolphin organization. He was sent into training with Charlie Appleby at Godolphin's British base in Newmarket, Suffolk.

He was from the eleventh crop of foals sired by Teofilo, who was undefeated champion as a two-year-old. At stud, Teofilo has been a highly successful breeding stallion, shuttling to Australia, siring major winners such as Exultant in Hong Kong, Happy Clapper, Humidor and the sire of two Melbourne Cup winners, Twilight Payment and Cross Counter in Australia. Nations Pride became Teofilo's 23rd top-level winner. Teofilo stood at Kildangan Stud for €30,000 in Ireland in 2021.

Nations Pride's dam Important Time raced twelve times and won three times with her most important victory in the Listed Stutenpreis des Gestuts Winterhauch over 1850 metres (~1 mile 1 furlong 43 yards) at Cologne in Germany.

Statistics

Legend:

 
 

Notes:

An (*) asterisk after the odds means Nations Pride was the post-time favourite.

Pedigree

Nations Pride is inbred 4s × 4d to Danzig.

References

2019 racehorse births
Racehorses bred in Ireland
Racehorses trained in the United Kingdom
Thoroughbred family 10
American Grade 1 Stakes winners
Horse racing track record setters